Montgomery Hall is a historical building located on the Colorado College Campus that was added to the NRHP on September 13, 1990. It is the second oldest building on the campus. It is used as a dormitory for women attending Colorado College. Montgomery Hall was named after Elizabeth Robinson Montgomery, the sister of the college's President William F. Slocum's wife.

References

University and college buildings on the National Register of Historic Places in Colorado
Colorado State Register of Historic Properties
Colorado College
Buildings and structures in Colorado Springs, Colorado
National Register of Historic Places in Colorado Springs, Colorado